The 2009–10 CBA season was the 15th CBA season. Guangdong Southern Tigers won their third consecutive CBA title for the second time, defeating Xinjiang Flying Tigers in the Finals, four games to one.

Yunnan Bulls were suspended for the season due to salary reasons, and would conditionally retain their eligibility for the 2010–11 season.

Foreign players of each team could play no more than 6 quarters (5 quarters when facing Bayi Rockets) collectively each game. Asian players were not regarded as foreign players.

In the Playoffs, the distance of 3 point line expanded from 6.25m to 6.75m.

Coaching changes

Regular Season standings

All-star weekend

Rookie Challenge

All-star game

 Hu Xuefeng was replaced by Liu Wei in the starting lineup due to finger injury. 

 Unable to participate due to injury. Olumide Oyedeji was named as the replacement for Stromile Swift.
 Stephon Marbury was awarded the MVP of the game.

Slam Dunk Contest

 Unable to participate due to injury. Zhang Zhihan and Zhang Ji were named as replacements for Stromile Swift.

Three-Point Shootout

Skills Challenge

 Unable to participate due to personal reasons. Yang Ming was named as the replacement for Stephon Marbury.

Playoffs

Teams in bold advanced to the next round. The numbers to the left of each team indicate the team's seeding in regular season, and the numbers to the right indicate the number of games the team won in that round. Home court advantage belongs to the team with the better regular season record; teams enjoying the home advantage are shown in italics.

Statistics leaders

Notes and references

External links
Official Website 
Sina CBA Coverage

     
League
Chinese Basketball Association seasons
CBA